Leanne Frahm is an Australian writer of speculative short fiction.

Biography
Frahm was born in Brisbane, Queensland, Australia in 1946. She received her first nomination for her work in 1978 when she was a finalist for the 1979 Ditmar Award for best fan writer. The following year she won the best fan writer award. Frahm's first publication was in 1980, entitled "The Wood for the Trees" which was published in the anthology Chrysalis 6, edited by Roy Torgeson. In 1981 Frahm's work, "Deus Ex Corporus", won the 1981 Ditmar Award for best Australian short fiction. She won a Ditmar again in 1994 for "Catalyst". In 1996 her story "Borderline" won the 1996 Aurealis Award for best science fiction short story. The following year she won the Ditmar Award for best fan writer for the second time.

Bibliography

Short fiction
"The Wood for the Trees" (1980) in Chrysalis 6 (ed. Roy Torgeson)
"Passage to Earth" (1980) in Galileo, January 1980 (ed. Charles C. Ryan)
"Deus Ex Corporus" (1980) in Chrysalis 7 (ed. Roy Torgeson)
"Barrier" (1980) in Chrysalis 8 (ed. Roy Torgeson)
"Beyond Our Shores, a Colony" (1981 with Paul Collins) in Distant Worlds (ed. Paul Collins)
"Horn O' Plenty" (1981 with Terry Carr) in Stellar 7: Science Fiction Stories (ed. Judy-Lynn del Rey)
"A Way Back" (1983) in Universe 13 (ed. Terry Carr)
"Lost" (1983) in Chrysalis 10 (ed. Roy Torgeson)
"High Tide" (1983) in Fears (ed. Charles L. Grant)
"The Visitor" (1985) in Midnight (ed. Charles L. Grant)
"On the Turn" (1986) in Shadows 9 (ed. Charles L. Grant)
"The Supramarket" (1987) in Doom City (ed. Charles L. Grant)
"Reichelman's Relics" (1990) in Amazing Stories, July 1990 (ed. Patrick Lucien Price)
"Olive Truffles" (1991, a.k.a. "Olivetruffles") in Eidolon (Australian magazine), Winter 1991 (ed. Jeremy G. Byrne)
"The Buyer" (1991) in Aurealis #5 (ed. Stephen Higgins, Dirk Strasser)
"The Lamadium Affair" (1992) in Eidolon (Australian magazine), Spring 1992 (ed. Jeremy G. Byrne, Jonathan Strahan)
"Catalyst" (1993) in Terror Australis: The Best of Australian Horror (ed. Leigh Blackmore)
"Land's End" (1994) in Alien Shores : An Anthology of Australian Science Fiction (ed. Peter McNamara, Margaret Winch)
"Jinx Ship" (1994) in The Patternmaker : Nine Science Fiction Stories (ed. Lucy Sussex)
"Entropy" (1995) in Bonescribes: Year's Best Australian Horror: 1995 (ed. Bill Congreve, Robert Hood)
"Borderline" (1996) in Borderline (ed. Leanne Frahm)
"Ithaca Week" (1996) in Borderline (ed. Leanne Frahm)
"Rain Season" (1998) in Eidolon (Australian magazine), Issue 27, Autumn 1998 (ed. Jonathan Strahan, Jeremy G. Byrne, Richard Scriven)
"Skein Dogs" (2005) in The Year's Best Australian Science Fiction & Fantasy: Volume Two (ed. Bill Congreve, Michelle Marquardt)

Collections
Borderline (1996)

Essays
Bibliography (1996) in Borderline (ed. Leanne Frahm)

Source: isfdb.org

Awards and nominations
Aurealis Awards
Best horror short story
1995: Nomination: "Entropy"
Best science fiction short story
1996: Win: "Borderline"
2005: Nomination: "Skein Dogs"

Ditmar Awards
Best fan writer
1979: Nomination
1980: Win
1981: Nomination
1984: Nomination
1998: Win
Best Australian short fiction
1981: Win: "Deus Ex Corporus"
1981: Nomination: "Passages to Earth"
1987: Nomination: "The Supramarket"
1997: Nomination: "Borderline"
Best short fiction
1992: Nomination: "Olive Truffles"
1994: Win: "Catalyst"
1995: Nomination: "Jinx Ship"
1995: Nomination: "Land's End"
1996: Nomination: "Entropy"

References

1946 births
Australian horror writers
Australian science fiction writers
Living people
Women science fiction and fantasy writers
Australian women short story writers